Peter K. Manning (born September 27, 1940) is an American sociologist who is an author and speaker on the topic of policing organizations.

Background 
Peter K. Manning was born in Salem, Oregon on September 27, 1940. He graduated from Willamette University in 1961. Manning went on to earn his M.A. and Ph.D in Sociology from Duke University in 1963 and 1966 respectively.

Career 
Peter K. Manning is a Senior Fellow at The Garfinkel Archive. He previously held the Brooks Chair in the College of Criminal Justice at Northeastern University, Boston, MA. He has taught at Michigan State, MIT, Oxford, and the University of Michigan. "His research interests includes the rationalizing and interplay of private and public policing, democratic policing, crime mapping and crime analysis, uses of information technology, and qualitative methods."

Manning's works 
 Youth and Sociology
 Youth: Divergent Perspectives
 The Sociology of Mental Health and Illness
 Police Work: The Social Organization of Policing
 Policing: A View from the Street
 Police Narcotics Control: Patterns and Strategies
 The Narcs' Game: Organizational and Informational Limits on Drug Law Enforcement
 Handbook of Social Science Methods, Volume II, Qualitative Methods
 Semiotics and Fieldwork
 Symbolic Communication: Signifying Calls and the Police Response
 Organizational Communication
 The Privatization of Policing: Two Views
 Policing Contingencies
 The Technology of Policing: Crime Mapping, Information Technology and the Rationality of Crime Control
 Democratic Policing in a Changing World with Michael W. Raphael

Listed in 
 American Men and Women of Science and Behavioral Sciences, Jacques Cattell Press: Tucson, Arizona, from 1970 edition.
 Contemporary Authors, Gale Research, Detroit, Michigan, from 1977 edition

References

External links
Dissertation
Faculty Profile
Amazon Author Profile
Google Scholar Profile
Academia.edu Profile

Living people
1940 births
Willamette University alumni
Duke University alumni
Writers from Portland, Oregon
Northeastern University faculty
Michigan State University faculty
Massachusetts Institute of Technology faculty
University of Michigan faculty
American expatriates in the United Kingdom